Westringia amabilis is a species of flowering plant in the family Lamiaceae and grows in New South Wales and Queensland. It is a small shrub with ovate-shaped leaves and light mauve to white flowers and brownish spots in the throat.

Description
Flowering occurs throughout the year.

Taxonomy and naming
Westringia amabilis was first formally described in 1949 by Joseph Robert Bernard Boivin and the description was published in Proceedings of the Royal Society of Queensland. The specific epithet (amabilis) means "loveable".

Distribution and habitat
This westringia grows in rocky locations in forests and sometimes along roadsides north of the Manning River in New South Wales and Queensland.

References 

amabilis
Flora of New South Wales
Flora of Queensland
Plants described in 1949
Lamiales of Australia